Solid State is the ninth studio album by singer-songwriter Jonathan Coulton. It was released on April 28, 2017. Coulton describes it as "a concept album about the internet, trolls, artificial intelligence, and how love and empathy will save humanity!" Coulton says that the album "has a bit of a concept behind it," with a "character that you follow throughout his life."

Recording
The album was recorded, mixed and produced by Christian Cassan at the Secret Garden recording studio in Brooklyn, New York.

The album features additional vocals from Aimee Mann on several songs, including "All This Time," as well as guest guitar work from Dave Gregory on two tracks.

Personnel 
All words and music by Jonathan Coulton

All vocals by Jonathan Coulton

All instruments and noises by Jonathan Coulton and Christian Cassan except:

Aimee Mann - Background and harmony vocals tracks 2, 3, 5, 6, 7, 9,13 and 15

Dave Gregory - Slide guitar and guitar solo track 5, electric guitars and guitar solo track 11

Bennett Paster - Piano tracks 1, 6 and 7

John Widgren - Pedal steel guitar tracks 2, 3, 6, 13 and 14

Roberto Cassan - Accordion track 6

Kenneth H. Rampton - Trumpet and flugelhorn track 11

Ball and Chain horns arrangement by Christian Cassan

Produced, Recorded and Mixed by Christian Cassan at The Secret Garden

Mastered by Dave Cooley at Elysian Masters

Release
The album was released on April 28, available as digital download, on double vinyl and CD. The album's first single, "All This Time", was released on February 28.

Graphic novel
On April 28, along with the album itself, Coulton released a graphic novel, written by Matt Fraction and illustrated by Albert Monteys. The graphic novel is meant to follow the same story as the album, but further fleshed out.

Live performances
The album premiered on the 2015 JoCo Cruise, when Coulton played early recordings of the songs "All This Time" and "Don't Feed the Trolls".

On the 2016 Cruise, Coulton played "Brave", "Square Things", "All This Time" and "Your Tattoo", all live, with fellow singer-songwriter and friend Aimee Mann.

On the 2017 Cruise, Coulton performed two more songs for the first time, "Pictures of Cats" and "Ordinary Man". This was also the first time he played "Don't Feed the Trolls" live, as he only played a recording during 2015.

In addition, he performed songs from Solid State as part of his opening act for Aimee Mann's 2017–‘18 tours for her album Mental Illness for which he had co-written three songs in addition to providing backing vocals and instrumentation. Advance copies of the album were available on both vinyl and CD during the main 2017 tour, along with the accompanying graphic novel and T-shirts.

Track listing

References

2017 albums
SuperEgo Records albums
Jonathan Coulton albums
Concept albums
Science fiction concept albums